Peter Lowry (born October 2, 1985 in Missoula, Montana) is a former American soccer player. He is current an assistant coach of Lipscomb Bisons men soccer team.

Career

College and amateur
Lowry grew up in Fair Oaks, California. He played club soccer for Irvine Strikers under head coach Don Ebert. Lowry played college soccer at Santa Clara University from 2004 to 2007, and played in the USL Premier Development League for Ajax Orlando Prospects, Boulder Rapids Reserve and San Jose Frogs.

Professional
Lowry was drafted in the second round (26th overall) of the 2008 MLS SuperDraft by Chicago Fire. He made his full professional debut for Fire on 1 July 2008, in a US Open Cup third-round game against Cleveland City Stars. Lowry stayed with Chicago through the 2010 season.

On November 24, 2010, Lowry was selected by Portland Timbers in the 2010 MLS Expansion Draft and spent the 2011 season with Portland. The club announced on November 28, 2011 that it was declining the 2012 contract option for Lowry. Lowry entered the 2011 MLS Re-Entry Draft but was not selected and became a free agent.

References

External links

1985 births
Living people
American soccer players
Santa Clara Broncos men's soccer players
Ajax Orlando Prospects players
Colorado Rapids U-23 players
San Jose Frogs players
Chicago Fire FC players
Portland Timbers players
USL League Two players
Major League Soccer players
Chicago Fire FC draft picks
Soccer players from Montana
People from Fair Oaks, California
All-American men's college soccer players
Association football midfielders